Volger Branch is a stream in Atchison County in the U.S. state of Missouri. It is a tributary of Rock Creek.

Volger apparently is a corruption of Vogler, the surname of a pioneer settler.

See also
List of rivers of Missouri

References

Rivers of Atchison County, Missouri
Rivers of Missouri